The 2021–22 Mid-American Conference women's basketball season began with practices in October 2021, followed by the start of the 2021–22 NCAA Division I women's basketball season in November. Conference play began in January 2022 and concluded in March 2022.  Toledo won the MAC regular season championship with a conference record of 19–1.

With the automatic bid, Buffalo was the only MAC school to qualify for the NCAA tournament where they lost to Tennessee in the first round. Toledo, Akron, Ball State, Kent State, and Ohio all accepted bids to the WNIT. Bowling Green accepted a bid to the WBI.

Preseason Awards
The preseason coaches' poll and league awards were announced by the league office on November 3, 2021.

Preseason women's basketball coaches poll
(First place votes in parenthesis)
 Ohio (4) 132
  (3) 124
 Buffalo (3) 123
  102
  (1) 83
  80
  79
  67
  (1) 65
  31
  27
  23

MAC Tournament Champion: Buffalo (5), Ohio (3), BGSU (2), Ball State (1), EMU (1)

Honors

All-MAC Awards

Mid-American women's basketball weekly awards

Postseason

Mid–American Tournament

Postseason Awards

Coach of the Year: Tricia Cullop, Toledo
Player of the Year: Jordyn Dawson, Akron
Freshman of the Year: Georgia Woolley, Buffalo
Defensive Player of the Year: Jordyn Dawson, Akron \ Cece Hooks, Ohio
Sixth Player of the Year: Hannah Noveroske, Toledo

Honors

See also
2021–22 Mid-American Conference men's basketball season

References